Falsepilysta is a genus of beetles in the family Cerambycidae, containing the following species:

 Falsepilysta albostictica Breuning, 1939
 Falsepilysta bifasciata (Aurivillius, 1923)
 Falsepilysta guttata (Aurivillius, 1924)
 Falsepilysta laterimaculata (Heller, 1924)
 Falsepilysta ochraceomaculata (Schwarzer, 1931)
 Falsepilysta olivacea (Schwarzer, 1931)
 Falsepilysta rosselli Breuning, 1982

References

Apomecynini
Taxa named by Stephan von Breuning (entomologist)